Barry John Kemp,  (born 14 May 1940) is an English archaeologist and Egyptologist. He is Professor Emeritus of Egyptology at the University of Cambridge and directing excavations at Amarna in Egypt. His widely renowned book Ancient Egypt: Anatomy of a Civilisation is a core text of Egyptology and many Ancient History courses.

Early life and education
Kemp was born on 14 May 1940. He studied Egyptology at the University of Liverpool, graduating with a Bachelor of Arts (BA) degree in 1962.

Academic career
In 1962, Kemp joined the University of Cambridge as an assistant lecturer. He was promoted to lecturer in 1969, Reader in Egyptology in 1990, and made Professor of Egyptology in 2005. He was also a Fellow of Wolfson College, Cambridge from 1990 to 2007. He retired from full-time academia in 2007, and was made professor emeritus. Since 2008, he has been a senior fellow of the McDonald Institute for Archaeological Research at Cambridge.

From 1977 until 2008, he was the director of excavation and archaeological survey at Amarna for the Egypt Exploration Society. He continues his research of the Amarna Period of ancient Egypt as director of the Amarna Project and secretary of the Amarna Trust. He has also contributed to many highly regarded and widely used Egyptology texts, including Civilisations of the Ancient Near East, edited by Jack Sasson. He is a co-author of Bruce Trigger's Ancient Egypt: A Social History, which incorporates the work of many leading Egyptologists and addresses recent trends in the subject. Kemp states he is interested in developing a holistic picture of Ancient Egyptian society rather than focussing on the elite culture that dominates the archaeological record: "This holistic approach involves explaining the present appearance of the site in terms of all the agencies at work..."

Honours
Kemp was elected Fellow of the British Academy (FBA) in 1992. He was appointed Commander of the Order of the British Empire (CBE) in the 2011 New Year Honours for services to archaeology, education and international relations in Egypt.

Publications

References

External links

English Egyptologists
Living people
Commanders of the Order of the British Empire
Fellows of the British Academy
Academics of the University of Cambridge
Fellows of Wolfson College, Cambridge
1940 births